Tiffany Packard, known as Tippy Packard,, is a figure skater who represented Hong Kong and United States. Packard is an American professional ice skater and choreographer. She first gained attention in 2013, when the 18-year-old won her third Hong Kong Championship and began her career in show biz with Happiness is…Snoopy. Packard continued her professional skating career in mid 2013 as a female principle in Royal Caribbean Ice Shows and CNE-Canadian National Exhibition. She toured over 40 countries as a show skater after retiring from the competitive sport. In 2018, she joined a part of ice skating history by becoming the female principle for the 75th Anniversary of Holiday on Ice.

She was announced as a professional skater in Dancing on Ice Series 14.

She is three time Hong Kong National Champion and Worlds Competitor. In 2022, Packard became a professional skater on the ITV skating series Dancing on Ice. In her first season, she was paired with Olympic BMX racer Kye Whyte. In Season 14, Packard and her partner Kye Whyte had an extremely successful first year. Kye and Tippy were announced the semi-finalist for Series 14.

References 

Hong Kong female single skaters
American female single skaters
1995 births
Living people
Sportspeople from Los Angeles County, California
American sportspeople of Hong Kong descent